Azwan Ali may refer to:

 Azwan Ali Rahman (born 1992), Bruneian footballer 
 Azwan Ali (actor) (born 1966), Malaysian actor